Scrobipalpa wiltshirei is a moth in the family Gelechiidae. It was described by Povolný in 1966. It is found on the Canary Islands and in North Africa, Portugal, Spain, on Cyprus and in Iran.

The forewings range from nearly uniform light brownish to dark brown with three marks and sprinkled with various dark scales. The hindwings are dirty whitish to grey.

References

Scrobipalpa
Moths described in 1966